Tonj Airport  is an airport serving Tonj in South Sudan. It is located in Tonj County in Tonj State, in the town of Tonj, in the northwestern part of South Sudan. The airport is located just outside town to the west of the central business district.

The geographic coordinates of this airport are: 7° 15' 59.89"N, 28° 39' 44.35"E (Latitude: 7.266639; Longitude: 28.662322). The airport has a single unpaved runway, the dimensions of which are not publicly known at this time.

Overview
Tonj Airport is a small civilian that serves the town of Tonj and surrounding communities. The airport does not yet receive regular scheduled airline service.

Accidents
On 20 December 2009, a turboprop British Aerospace BAe-748-398, with four crew members and 37 passengers, registration 5Y-YKM, operated by 748 Air Services, overshot the runway while landing, striking a cluster of houses and killing a woman and her child on the ground. None of the occupants were injured but the plane was damaged beyond repair and was written off.

See also
 Tonj
 Warrap (state)
 Bahr el Ghazal
 List of airports in South Sudan

References

External links
 Location of Tonj Airport At Google Maps

Airports in South Sudan
Warrap (state)
Bahr el Ghazal